Kramers can refer to:

 Kramers (bookstore), Independent bookstore in Dupont Circle, Washington, D.C., United States
 Kramers (crater), an old lunar impact crater on the northern hemisphere on the far side of the Moon
 Kramers F.C., football team from Palau

People
 Johannes Hendrik Kramers (26 February 1891 – 17 December 1951), Dutch scholar of Islam
 Hans Kramers (2 February 1894 – 24 April 1952), Dutch physicist

See also
 Kramers' law, physics, spectral distribution of X-rays